Cássio Alves de Barros (born 17 January 1970) is a Brazilian professional football manager and former player.

Cássio scored 10 goals in 274 appearances for Vasco da Gama between 1989 and 1997 and earned his only cap in a friendly between the Brazil national football team and Wales in 1991. Towards the end of his career, Cássio played 33 games for Stuttgarter Kickers in the 2. Bundesliga.

Honours

Player 
Vasco da Gama
 Campeonato Brasileiro:  1989
 Campeonato Carioca: 1992, 1993, 1994

References

External links 
 

1970 births
Living people
Footballers from Rio de Janeiro (city)
Brazilian footballers
Brazil international footballers
Association football defenders
Brazilian football managers
Campeonato Brasileiro Série A players
2. Bundesliga players
CR Vasco da Gama players
Fluminense FC players
Santos FC players
Associação Portuguesa de Desportos players
Stuttgarter Kickers players
Goiás Esporte Clube players
Brazilian expatriate footballers
Esporte Clube Tigres do Brasil managers
Duque de Caxias Futebol Clube managers